Christian Seel (born 28 December 1983) in Troisdorf) is a German player of chess and shogi, and an academic specializing in economics and game theory.

Academic career
Seel has a Ph.D. from the University of Bonn, and is an associate professor in the Department of Microeconomics and Public Economics at Maastricht University, where his research involves game theory and bounded rationality.

Shogi 
In shogi, Seel placed third in the 2012 German open championship, winning 2nd Dan.

Chess 

Seel has been an International Master (IM) in chess since 2004. In the Chess Bundesliga, he plays first board for the SK Aachen team.

He is the author of a chess opening book on the Antoshin variation of the Philidor Defence (1.e4 e5 2.Nf3 d6 3.d4 exd4 4.Nxd4 Nf6 5.Nc3 Be7). Originally in German, entitled Geheimwaffe Philidor (Chessgate, 2005), it has been translated into English as The Philidor: A Secret Weapon (Chessgate, 2007).

References

External links
 
 
 

1983 births
Academic staff of Maastricht University
German chess writers
German chess players
Chess International Masters
German shogi players
Living people